Aspidoscelis lineattissimus, the many-lined whiptail, is a species of teiid lizard endemic to Mexico.

References

lineattissimus
Reptiles described in 1878
Taxa named by Edward Drinker Cope
Reptiles of Mexico
Taxobox binomials not recognized by IUCN